Cyberabad Metropolitan Police,  popularly known as Cyberabad Police, is the  police commissionerate located in  Gachibowli, Rangareddy district, Telangana, India. It was created in 2003 by bifurcating Rangareddy District Police.

Current structure
Currently the Cyberabad Metropolitan Police has 5 DCP zones.

Rajendranagar DCP Zone (New)
Chevella ACP Division
Chevella 
Shabad
Moinabad

Rajendranagar ACP Division
Rajendranagar
Mailardevpally
Attapur (New)

Narsingi ACP Division (New)
Shankarpally
Narsingi
Mokila (New)
Kolluru (New)

Madhapur DCP Zone
Madhapur ACP Division
Madhapur
Raidurgam
Gachibowli
Women PS

Miyapur ACP Division
Chandanagar
Miyapur
RC Puram

Balanagar DCP Zone
Balanagar ACP Division
Balanagar
Sanath nagar 
Jeedimetla
Jagadgirigutta
Kukatpally ACP Division
Kukatpally
KPHB Colony
Bachupally
Allapur (New)

Medchal DCP Zone (New)
Medchal ACP Division (New)
Medchal
Dundigal
Suraram (New)

Pet-basheerabad ACP Division
Pet-basheerabad
Shamirpet
Alwal
Genome Valley (New)

Shamshabad DCP Zone
Shamshabad ACP Division
Shamshabad
RGI Airport
Kothur
Nandigama
Shadnagar ACP Division
Shadnagar
Shadnagar Rural Circle
Keshampet
Kondurg
Chowdariguda

Amangal Circle
Amangal
Talakondapally
Kadthal

Traffic wing
 
Rajendranagar Division 
Chevella Traffic Police Station
Rajendranagar Traffic Police Station
Narsingi Traffic Police Station (New)
Balanagar Division
Balanagar Traffic Police Station
Jeedimetla Traffic Police Station
Kukatpally Traffic Police Station
KPHB Traffic Police Station (New)
Madhapur Division
Madhapur Traffic Police Station
Miyapur Traffic Police Station
Gachibowli Traffic Police Station
Raidurgam Traffic Police Station (New)
Shamshabad Division
Shamshabad Traffic Police Station
Shadnagar Traffic Police Station
Medchal Division
Medchal Traffic Police Station (New)
Alwal Traffic Police Station

Police Commissioners
1. Mahendar Reddy, IPS. (2003-2006 Dec)
2. Prabhakar Reddy, IPS. (2007 Jan - 2010 Dec)
3. Tirumala rao, IPS. (2011 Jan - 2013 May)
4. C.V Anand, IPS. (2013 May 2016 Jun)
5. Naveen Chand, IPS. 
6. Sandeep sandilya, IPS. 
7. V.C Sajjanar, IPS
8. Stephen Ravindra, IPS*.

Controversies
Cyberabad Police drew a lot of flak after the Supreme Court of India Enquiry Commission headed by Justice V. S. Sirpurkar declared that the encounter killing of the four accused persons in the 2019 Hyderabad gang rape was a planned cold blooded murder by Cyberabad Police officials. Odisha poet Dr Tapan Kumar Pradhan has also alleged in his books and social media posts that Cyberabad Police lodged false FIRs and false charge sheets with the help of fake witnesses, fake affidavits and fake panchnama in the Hemangi Sharma Fraud Case.

See also
Rachakonda commissionerate
Hyderabad City Police
Telangana State Police Academy

References

Government of Telangana
 
2003 establishments in Andhra Pradesh
Government agencies established in 2003